= Two sharps =

Two sharps may refer to:

- D major, a major musical key with two sharps
- B minor, a minor musical key with two sharps
